Guernsey State Park is a public recreation area surrounding the Guernsey Reservoir, an impoundment of the North Platte River, one mile northwest of the town of Guernsey in Platte County, Wyoming, USA. The state park has  campgrounds, boat ramps and hiking trails as well as exceptional examples of structures created by the Civilian Conservation Corps in the 1930s. Facilities are managed for the Bureau of Reclamation by the Wyoming Division of State Parks and Historic Sites.

History
The park began with the construction of the Guernsey Dam, started in 1925 and completed in 1927. Between 1934 and 1939, workers with the Civilian Conservation Corps created recreational facilities on the land surrounding the dam's reservoir. Park management fell to the state of Wyoming in 1957.

Lake Guernsey State Park (also known as Guernsey State Park Historic District, Lake Guernsey Park, Guernsey Lake Park, or Guernsey State Park) was declared a National Historic Landmark District in 1997 for its design history and construction.  The park's design was the result of the first collaboration between the National Park Service and the Bureau of Reclamation, and its infrastructure was built by Civilian Conservation Corps crews. The historic district contains 60 contributing resources: 14 buildings, three sites and 43 structures, as well as 46 non-contributing resources.

Features
The Guernsey State Park Museum offers information about the CCC and the natural and cultural history of the area. The park contains a separate National Historic Landmark, the Oregon Trail Ruts. Register Cliff, another feature of the Oregon Trail listed on the National Register of Historic Places, is located two miles southeast of the park.

Activities and amenities
The park has seven campgrounds and three boat ramps. Fish species include walleye, yellow perch and channel catfish. Fish populations are affected by the reservoir's twice-yearly draw-downs.

References

External links

Guernsey State Park Wyoming State Parks, Historic Sites & Trails
Guernsey State Park Brochure and Map Wyoming State Parks, Historic Sites & Trails
Lake Guernsey State Park National Historic Landmark  at the Wyoming State Historic Preservation Office

Historic American Landscapes Survey (HALS) documentation:

National Historic Landmarks in Wyoming
Protected areas of Platte County, Wyoming
National Park Service rustic in Wyoming
Civilian Conservation Corps museums
Natural history museums in Wyoming
Museums in Platte County, Wyoming
Civilian Conservation Corps in Wyoming
State parks of Wyoming
Park buildings and structures on the National Register of Historic Places in Wyoming
Historic American Buildings Survey in Wyoming
Historic American Landscapes Survey in Wyoming
Historic districts on the National Register of Historic Places in Wyoming
National Register of Historic Places in Platte County, Wyoming
IUCN Category III
Protected areas established in 1934
1934 establishments in Wyoming